Jakub Friteyre-Durvé (1725–1792) was a French Jesuit.
He was born in Marsac-en-Livradois, a town in Puy-de-Dôme.

References

1725 births
1792 deaths
French beatified people
18th-century French Jesuits
French clergy killed in the French Revolution